William Dimmick may refer to:
 William A. Dimmick, American Episcopal bishop
 William Harrison Dimmick, member of the U.S. House of Representatives from Pennsylvania